In 1148, a Council of Reims was called by Pope Eugene III to consider a number of regulations, or canons, for the Church, as well as to debate some other issues. Originally the summons for the council went out in October 1147 and it was supposed to be held in Trier, which is now in Germany, but conditions in Trier were such that it was moved to Reims, in France, for February 1148. A number of the bishops and other church officials who were convoked did not attend and Eugene suspended many of the non-attendees, excepting the Italian ecclesiastics, who were excused. The council lasted 11 days, and convened on 21 March 1148. From 400 to 1100 ecclesiastics are considered to have attended, although this number does not include the various servants and officials of the attendees, who would have swelled the numbers.

After the conclusion of the council, Eugene held a consistory trial of Gilbert of Poitiers, the Bishop of Poitiers, who was accused of heretical teachings. In the end, Gilbert was allowed to return to his bishopric.

Preliminaries and attendees

The council was first called on 11 October 1147 by Eugene, who ordered the bishops and others summoned to the council to assemble at Trier on 21 March 1148. This is from a letter sent to Henry Zdík, the Bishop of Olmuetz by the pope. However, a letter sent by the pope on the next day, 12 October 1147, to Eberhard, Archbishop of Salzburg, named Troyes as the location for the council. It is likely that Troyes, however, was a scribal error, as a further letter of Eugene's, to Suger, Abbot of St Denis, dated 6 October 1147, named Trier as the location also, thus confirming the location given in the letter of 11 October.

The papal entourage arrived in Trier on 30 November 1147, but shortly after arrival the pope decided to move the proceedings because of complaints from the residents of Trier, and announced in February 1148 that the council would move to Reims, but still on the date given before. A feature of the council was that the pope ordered the attendance of the various bishops and other officials. Although some requested attendees were excused, it was mostly due to ill health, not to the need to see to the business of their offices. Those who did not attend were suspended from office. The Italian bishops, however, were mostly excused from attendance, as Eugene held a council at Cremona in July 1148 where the Reims decrees were announced.

Although the number of Spanish bishops who attended is unknown, the Archbishop of Toledo, Raymund, did attend. King Alfonso VII of León and Castile interceded with the pope to lift the sentences against those bishops who did not attend. King Stephen of England refused permission for any of the English bishops to attend, except for the bishops of Hereford, Norwich and Chichester. It was the papal summons which caused the Archbishop of Canterbury, Theobald of Bec, to quarrel with his king, after Stephen refused the archbishop permission to go to the council. Theobald instead managed to evade the guards placed on him and hired a fishing boat to take him across the English Channel to attend the council.

The precise number of bishops, archbishops, and abbots who attended is unknown. Estimates range from 1,100 to 400, with the lower number being much more likely. The attendees were from what were later the countries of France, Germany, England, and Spain, and in keeping with the times, would have included not just the prelates who were summoned, but also their servants and officials, making the true number of people in Reims impossible to know.

Council

The opening of the council took place on 21 March 1148 at Reims Cathedral on a Sunday. Eugene and his attendants had arrived in Reims by 9 March. The main business of the council was the debate on a number of canons, or rules, for the church that would be announced. Most of these were not new decrees, having been promulgated by Eugene's predecessor at the councils of Reims in 1131 and at the Lateran council of 1139. All of the proposed canons were approved, except for one on clerical attire which was opposed by Rainald of Dassel and other German ecclesiastics. This canon had prohibited cloaks made of fur. Another canon condemning clerical marriage was greeted with amusement, as the council members felt that all clergy should already know that marriage was forbidden to them.

The Reims council also condemned and ordered the arrest of Éon de l'Étoile, a Breton heretic. He was eventually tortured into confession and imprisoned until his death in 1150. Further decrees condemned the Anacletans, supporters of an earlier antipope, who had previously been condemned in 1136. Further side business was the settling of a dispute between two Norman abbots – Eustachius of Jumièges Abbey and Robert of the Abbey of St. Vincent, Le Mans, which was handed to two cardinals to decide. The two prelates reached a decision on 5 April. Other disputes, including ones between abbots, were also handled at the council, although not necessarily during the council deliberations. Also included in the council's business was the confirmation of the excommunication of the Bishop of Dol and the Bishop of Brieux. Although it was reported that the Bishop of Orléans and the Bishop of Troyes were deposed by the council, this is erroneous, and probably stemmed from the number of ecclesiastics who were suspended for non-attendance.

A number of ecclesiastics died at or shortly after the council, including Robert de Bethune, the Bishop of Hereford, who fell ill on the third day of the council and died on either 14 or 16 April 1148. The Bishop of Angoulême died in June, after attending the council. The Archbishop of Trier, Albero de Montreuil, was so ill he was carried to the council on a horse litter.

The council is said to have lasted 11 days in total, but it is likely that it was shorter, given the large increase in the population of Reims, which would have strained the resources of the town. This gives an end date of the council of 1 April 1148.

Consistory

Although the council probably ended on 1 April, Eugene asked a number of attendees to stay after the formal close of the council to consider the case of Gilbert of Poitiers, who was under investigation for heresy, connected with his teachings. The main concern against Gilbert seems to have been his convoluted vocabulary and style of writing, which led to his writings being easily misunderstood. The specific problem came when Gilbert's writings attempted to explicate the relationship between God and his "divinity", which led to his opponents claiming that Gilbert was attempting to create two Gods, rather than just one. His opponents claimed that this occurred in Gilbert's treatise on Boethius' theological work De Trinitate.

Gilbert had previously been investigated by Eugene at Paris in April 1147, but this hearing came to nothing for two reasons. One was that Gilbert's opponents were not unified in what they opposed in Gilbert's teachings. The second reason was that no one had a copy of the treatise on Boethius by Gilbert that was in dispute. Prior to the second hearing at Reims, Bernard of Clairvaux, who was opposed to Gilbert's teachings, held a private meeting with a number of the attendees, where Bernard attempted to pressure them to condemn Gilbert. This offended the various cardinals in attendance, who then proceeded to insist that they were the only persons who could judge the case.

Although connected with the council, Gilbert was tried after the council closed, at a consistory held in the Archbishop of Reims' chambers. A consistory was a specialized form of trial held to investigate questionable theological teachings, and was beginning to be used for this purpose in this period. The consistory lasted two days, and included John of Salisbury, who had previously been a student of Gilbert's, but was now in Eugene's service. The trial likely took place on 2–3 April 1148, as it lasted took two days, and most accounts state that it took place during the week before Palm Sunday, which was 4 April that year. As the consistory took place after the closing of the council on 1 April, that only allows 2 and 3 April for the trial. However, if the council closed earlier than 1 April, then the trial could have taken place on 29–30 March 1148. In the end, no verdict of heresy was placed against Gilbert, who remained Bishop of Poitiers until his death in 1154.

Besides Bernard, other ecclesiastics in opposition to Gilbert were Robert of Melun and Peter the Lombard. Robert was a teacher at both Paris and Melun, and later became Bishop of Hereford. Another opponent was Otto of Freising, who was unable to attend the trial.

No official records of the trial were kept, which led to considerable confusion in the future.

Notes

1148 in Europe
Reims,1148
Reims,1148